

Events
 1511 – Dome of Seville Cathedral collapses.
 1512: March 5: West tower of Pieterskerk, Leiden, collapses.

Buildings and structures

Buildings

 1510–1520 – Tower ("Stump") of St Botolph's Church, Boston, England, completed.
 1510
 Alcázar de Colón ("Columbus' Palace") in Santo Domingo, the 22-room home of Don Diego Columbus.
 Sheffield Manor in Yorkshire, England.
 1511 – All Saints' Church, Wittenberg (Schloßkirche) completed to a design by Conrad Pflüger.
 1513 – Work on New Cathedral, Salamanca, begun.
 1514 – St Mark's Campanile in Venice completed in final form.
 1515 – Cardinal Wolsey begins rebuilding Hampton Court Palace on the River Thames near London.
 1515–1518 – Ancienne Douane (Haguenau) built.
 About 1515 – In England
 King's College Chapel, Cambridge completed by John Wastell.
 Spire of St James' Church, Louth, Lincolnshire completed.
 1517 – Shisha Gumbad tomb in Delhi, India, completed.
 1518
 Tomb of Sikandar Lodi, Delhi, India, completed.
 Town walls of Loreto, Marche, begun by Antonio da Sangallo the Younger.
 1519
 Belém Tower at the mouth of the Tagus in Portugal completed.
 St. Olaf's Church, Tallinn in Estonia completed.

Births
 1511: July 3 – Giorgio Vasari, Italian painter and biographer (died 1574)
 1511 – Bartolomeo Ammannati, Italian sculptor and architect (died 1592)
 1512 – Galeazzo Alessi, Italian architect (died 1572)
 c.1513 – Pirro Ligorio, Italian architect and painter (died 1583)

Deaths
 1511 – Simón de Colonia, Spanish architect and sculptor
 1514: March 11 – Donato Bramante, Italian architect (born 1444)
 1515
 April 10 – Mateus Fernandes, Portuguese architect
 Giovanni Giocondo, Italian friar, architect and classical scholar (born c. 1433)
 c. 1516 – Giuliano da Sangallo, Florentine sculptor, architect and military engineer (born 1443)
 1518 – John Wastell, English architect (born 1460)
 1519: May 2 – Leonardo da Vinci, Italian polymath (born 1452)

References 

1510s architecture
Architecture